Gorasul: The Legacy of the Dragon is a 2001 role-playing video game developed by the German studio Silver Style and published by JoWood.

Gameplay
Gorasul: The Legacy of the Dragon is a role-playing video game that takes place from an isometric graphical perspective.

Plot
Gorasul takes place in a fantasy setting and follows the story of Roszondas, an orphan raised by dragons. After being killed by demons, Roszondas awakens ten years in the future while suffering from amnesia.

Development
Gorasul was developed by the German company Silver Style, and was the studio's first game to appear in North America. It launched in fall 2001 in Germany and November 2001 in the United States.

GameSpot

According to the review aggregator Metacritic, Gorasul received "mixed or average reviews" from critics. In Computer Games Magazine, John Brandon found Gorasul "worth a look" despite its flaws. GameSpots Brett Todd wrote that the game "achieved something significant in copying the Baldur's Gate formula so well", but that its glitches and poor English translation made it a game "only for those who aren't easily frustrated or who have the patience to wait for a patch."

References

External links

2001 video games
Video games about dragons
JoWooD Entertainment games
Role-playing video games
Video games developed in Germany
Video games with isometric graphics
Windows games
Windows-only games
Silver Style Entertainment games